Visa requirements for Indian citizens are administrative entry restrictions by the authorities of other states placed on citizens of India. As of 10 February 2023, Indian citizens had visa-free or visa on arrival or e-visa access to 60 countries and territories, ranking the Indian passport 84th out of 110, in terms of travel freedom according to the Henley Passport Index. With visa-free entry to 23 countries and visa on arrival facility to 47 countries India shares 72th rank out of 96, in Global Passport Power Rank.

Recent changes
The requirement for a visa was removed by 
Indonesia in July 2017, 
Qatar in August 2017, 
Tunisia in October 2017.

e-Visa status was granted to parts of the Russian Far East: Primorye and the rest of Khabarovsk, Sakhalin, Chukotka and Kamchatka regions in 2018. Russia is set to issue e-Visas to Indian citizens for stays of up to 16 days beginning 1 January 2021.

Kyrgyzstan followed suit with online visitor visas in September 2017, Armenia in November 2017, and both Vietnam and Uzbekistan in 2018.

Indian citizens already in possession of a valid UK, United States, Canada or Schengen visa became eligible to apply for a visa on arrival to Oman in October 2017, Armenia in November 2017 and Chile (US visa only) in April 2019.

Similarly, Argentina allows Indian nationals with a valid US visa to apply for a ETA since March 2019.

All Indian passport bearers became eligible for a visa on arrival to Gabon in October 2017, Rwanda in January 2018, Zimbabwe, Angola and Jordan (but only with a valid Schengen, UK, US or Canadian visa) in December 2019, the Bahamas (but only with a valid Schengen, UK, US or Canadian visa) on 24 April 2018 and Iran on 22 July 2018.

Eligible Indian citizens can now participate in the Global Entry program for expedited entry into the United States.

France abolished airport transit visas (ATV) for Indian nationals after 23 July 2018.

Bangladesh and India both agreed to abolish visa application fees for each other's citizens in 2018. Thus Indian passport holders, who apply for a Bangladeshi visa in India, do not have to pay any visa application fee.

Myanmar has announced visa-on-arrival for Indian tourists entering the country through the international airports of Nay Pyi Taw, Yangon and Mandalay beginning 12 December 2018.

Kazakhstan has introduced a procedure for obtaining a single entry visa in electronic format from 1 January 2019.

Sri Lanka has announced free visa-on-arrival for Indian tourists, effective 1 August 2019.

Ecuador imposed visa restrictions on Indian nationals effective 12 August 2019.

Barbados has announced visa-free tourist and business visa for Indian nationals.

South Africa had launched an e-visa system for Indian travelers from  February 2022.

Ukraine has begun offering e-visas for tourism to Indian travelers from 14 August 2020.

Egypt has been offering e-visa for Indian nationals since 2021.

Oman announced visa-free entry to Indian citizens for tourism as on 12 January 2022.

Albania announced visa-free travel to indian citizens as on 23 April 2022 which is extended till the end of 2022.

Kazakhstan announced 14 day visa exemption to Indian nationals for tourism and business purposes on 8 July 2022.
Oman announced vise free travel for Indian citizens upto 10 days for sole purpose of tourism.

Morocco announced e-visa  to Indian nationals for tourism and business purposes on 1 August if you have Valid Schengen countries, the United States of America, Canada, the United Kingdom, Ireland, Australia and New Zealand, with multiple entries and that are valid for at least 90 days as of the date of submission of the eVisa application.

Georgia stopped issuing eVisas to Indian citizens in September 2022.

Thailand extended the validity of eVisa/Visa on arrival from 15 to 30 days eff.October 2022 to March 2023

Serbia will reintroduce visa restrictions on Indian nationals effective 1 January 2023. 

France reinstates airport transit visas (ATV) for Indian nationals. September 2022.

Germany, the Czech Republic, and Spain now mandatorily require Indian citizens to hold Airside Transit visa (ATV). November 2022.

Belarus announced visa-free travel for Indians (For EU countries and Schengen area visa holders), provided they are not transiting to or from (including airside) Russia and are arriving at Minsk International Airport.

Visa requirements map

Visa requirements

Dependent, disputed, or restricted territories
Unrecognized or partially recognized countries

Dependent and autonomous territories

Other territories
. Ashmore and Cartier Islands – Special authorisation required.
. Belovezhskaya Pushcha National Park – Visa not required for 3 days; must first obtain an electronic pass.
. Brest and Grodno – Visa not required for 10 days
 Crimea – Visa issued by Russia is required.
. Hainan – Visa on arrival for 15 days. Available at Haikou Meilan International Airport and Sanya Phoenix International Airport. Visa not required for 21 days for traveling as part of a tourist group (2 or more people)
. Tibet Autonomous Region – Tibet Travel Permit required (10 US Dollars)
. San Andrés and Leticia – Visitors arriving at Gustavo Rojas Pinilla International Airport and Alfredo Vásquez Cobo International Airport must buy tourist cards on arrival.
.  Galápagos – Online pre-registration is required. Transit Control Card must also be obtained at the airport prior to departure.
 outside Asmara – To travel in the rest of the country, a Travel Permit for Foreigners is required (20 Eritrean nakfa).
. Lau Province – Special permission required.
  Mount Athos – Special permit required (4 days: 25 euro for Orthodox visitors, 35 euro for non-Orthodox visitors, 18 euro for students). There is a visitors' quota: maximum 100 Orthodox and 10 non-Orthodox per day and women are not allowed.
. Kish Island – Visa not required.
. Closed cities – Special permission required for the town of Baikonur and surrounding areas in Kyzylorda Oblast, and the town of Gvardeyskiy near Almaty.
 outside Pyongyang – Special permit required. People are not allowed to leave the capital city, tourists can only leave the capital with a governmental tourist guide (no independent moving).
.  Sabah and  Sarawak – Visa not required. These states have their own immigration authorities and passport is required to travel to them, however the same visa applies.
 outside Malé – Permission required. Tourists are generally prohibited from visiting non-resort islands without the express permission of the Government of Maldives.
 – Kartarpur Corridor: No visa required, US$20 permit required.
 – Several closed cities and regions in Russia require special authorization.
 Mecca and Medina – Special access required. Non-Muslims and those following the Ahmadiyya religious movement are strictly prohibited from entry.
 Jeju Island – Visa-free entry for 30 days for Indian citizens provided arriving directly at Jeju Island.
. Darfur – Separate travel permit is required.
 outside Khartoum – All foreigners traveling more than 25 kilometers outside of Khartoum must obtain a travel permit.
. Gorno-Badakhshan Autonomous Province – OIVR permit required (15+5 Tajikistani Somoni) and another special permit (free of charge) is required for Lake Sarez.
. Closed cities – A special permit, issued prior to arrival by Ministry of Foreign Affairs, is required if visiting the following places: Atamurat, Cheleken, Dashoguz, Serakhs and Serhetabat.
. Closed city of Mercury, Nevada, United States – Special authorization is required for entry into Mercury.
. United States Minor Outlying Islands – Special permits required for Baker Island, Howland Island, Jarvis Island, Johnston Atoll, Kingman Reef, Midway Atoll, Palmyra Atoll and Wake Island.
. Margarita Island – Visa not required. All visitors are fingerprinted.
. Phú Quốc – Visa not required for 30 days.
 outside Sana'a or Aden – Special permission needed for travel outside Sana'a or Aden.
 UN Buffer Zone in Cyprus – Access Permit is required for travelling inside the zone, except Civil Use Areas.
 Korean Demilitarized Zone – Restricted area.
 UNDOF Zone and Ghajar – Restricted area.

Reciprocity
The Indian Government has not drafted any laws to mandate reciprocity in visa agreements with other countries. While a very small number of bilateral agreements have concluded with reciprocity for visa arrangements, a large number of visa relationships continue to be highly skewed to one side or the other.

In 2015, Iran revoked visa-on-arrival for Indian citizens after it was included as one of the eight countries in India's Prior Reference Category, which would be excluded from India's visa liberalisation plans for foreign tourists. The other countries on the list at the time were Pakistan, Afghanistan, Iraq, Somalia, Nigeria and Sudan.

Full reciprocity
India has, by default, achieved full reciprocity in visa-free or e-Visa privileges with following countries or regions:

  (Freedom of Movement)
  (Freedom of Movement)
  (Visa not required, for 90 days)
  (e-Visa required)
  (e-Visa required)
  (e-Visa required)
  (e-Visa required) -- Stopped for Indian citizens wef September 2022.
  (e-Visa required)
  (e-Visa required)
  (e-Visa required)
  (e-Visa/Visa on Arrival)
  (e-Visa required)
  (e-Visa required)
  (Electronic Authorization required)
  (e-Visa required)
  (e-Visa required)

Partial reciprocity
India has achieved partial reciprocity with following countries, where Indian Immigration rules afford the citizens of the following countries slightly lesser visa privileges than what the following countries provide for Indian Citizens:

Non-visa restrictions

Visa Exemptions

(This section is under construction, please help update it)

In some instances, a Visa Exemption permits entry in lieu of obtaining a Visa/ Entry Visa if in possession of the following Visas or Permanent Relationships, this is not limited to entitlements or provisions laid down by the country's law.
For example: Indian citizens holding valid US visa are permitted to enter Mexico on the basis of their US visa, without the need for a Mexican visa.

List of Visa Exemptions:
United States of America

Indian Citizens in possession of a valid United States Multiple Entry Visa in their passport may enter the following country(ies) visa-free: Albania, Argentina (Indian passport holders with a valid US B2 visa can avail an electronic travel authorization for the purposes of tourism), Bolivia, Bahamas, Belarus, Belize, Bosnia and Herzegovina, Chile, Colombia, Cuba, Dominican Republic, Georgia, Guatemala, Honduras, Mexico, Montenegro, Nicaragua, North Macedonia, Oman, Panama, Peru, Philippines, Saudi Arabia, South Korea, Turkey (eVisa), UAE.

European Union

European Union Family Member - Indian Citizens who are travelling with or joining their EU family members in the European Union in a Country other than where their family member is a citizen of does not require a Visa to enter and enjoy the same entry rights and stay, however this would be difficult to prove and as a result, entry could be refused. Visa should be applied for in advance which is usually with no or minimal requirements to meet if the applicant is a family member of an EU Citizen. For instance, a person who wants to travel with their spouse to France where their spouse is a Citizen of the Republic of Lithuania should apply for a Schengen Visa in advance or where a person wants to join their Lithuanian spouse who resides in France should also apply for a Schengen Visa in order to prove their right and avoid misconception. In most cases, airlines will not permit travel without a visa. There is no time limit a family member can stay (indefinite stay), they must just enter before the Visa expires if joining their family or travelling at the same time. There are no costs involved either. European Union citizens and their Indian family members will need to apply for settled or pre-settled status if they wish continue residing in the UK after 31 December 2020. Settled Status can be granted when the applicant has resided in the UK for 5 years and is valid indefinitely. In order to maintain settled status, people must visit the UK every 5 years. Pre-Settled status is granted when the applicant has resided in the UK for less than 5 years and is valid for 5 years. In order to maintain pre-settled status, people must visit the UK every two years. However, applicants would have to meet continuous residence until they reach 5 years if they want to qualify for settled status after 31 December 2020. It will not be possible to be granted another pre-settled Visa.

Schengen Visa (Long Stay) - Holder's of a Valid Long Stay Category D Visa who arrive in the Schengen European country of their Visa and apply for a Residence Card shortly after arriving will be able to use their EU residence permit/ card for travel within the Schengen States, if granted.

GCC visa

Visa-free or Visa on Arrival to : Egypt, Georgia, Armenia, Azerbaijan, Uzbekistan, Kyrgyzstan, Oman, Bahrain (GCC residents only, for Bahrain).

Foreign travel statistics

See also

 Visa policy of India
 Indian nationality law
 Overseas Citizenship of India

Notes

References

External links

India
Foreign relations of India
Indian nationality law